Henry Froude Seagram (c. July 1802 – 26 August 1843) was Lieutenant Governor of the Gambia from January 1843 and Governor from June 1843 to 26 August 1843, when he died there of fever. Later, however, from 1866 to 1888, The Gambia was again administered under the colony of Sierra Leone.

References

External links 
http://www.worldstatesmen.org/Gambia.html
https://www.britishempire.co.uk/maproom/gambia/gambiaadmin.htm

1802 births
1843 deaths
Governors of the Gambia